Caprice No. 24 in A minor is the final caprice of Niccolò Paganini's 24 Caprices, and a famous work for solo violin. The caprice, in the key of A minor, consists of a theme, 11 variations, and a finale. His 24 Caprices were probably composed in 1807, while he was in the service of the Baciocchi court.

It is widely considered one of the most difficult pieces ever written for the solo violin. It requires many highly advanced techniques such as parallel octaves and rapid shifting covering many intervals, extremely fast scales and arpeggios including minor scales, left hand pizzicato, high positions, and quick string crossings. Also, there are many double stops, including thirds and tenths.

Variations on the theme

The caprice has provided a rich seam of material for works by subsequent composers.  Compositions based on it, and transcriptions of it, include:
 Angra – Used the main theme for an interlude on electric guitar on the song Angels Cry, from the album of same name
 Aria – used as a basis for the main riff in the song Igra s ognyom (Playing with Fire) from the 1989 album of the same name. The plot of the song concerns a fictional violinist who is based on Paganini
 Leopold Auer – arranged it for violin with piano accompaniment, and added some variations of his own
 Rafał Augustyn - Paganini Variations, for solo piano (1987–1989) (reference: www.polmic.pl)
 Luc Baiwir – Variations on a Theme by Paganini, for solo piano (2007)
 David Baker – Ethnic Variations on a Theme of Paganini, for violin and piano
 BanYa – Caprice of Otada is based on Rachmaninoff's Rhapsody on a Theme of Paganini and is used in Pump it Up NX2
 Alison Balsom – recorded a version transcribed for trumpet
 James Barnes – Fantasy Variations on a Theme by Niccolo Paganini, a wind band arrangement with each variation as a solo for a particular section
 Isaak Berkovich – Variations on a Theme by Paganini, for solo piano (1950 ?)
 Boris Blacher – Variations on a Theme by Paganini (1947), for orchestra
 Hans Bottermund – Variations on a Theme by Paganini, for cello solo
 Johannes Brahms – Variations on a Theme of Paganini, Op. 35 (1862–63), for solo piano (2 books)
 Charles Camilleri – Paganiana, for two pianos
 Frédéric Chopin – quotes Niccolò Paganini's Caprice No. 24 in his Rondo à la Krakowiak and includes a variation on the quotation
 Keith Ramon Cole - Excursions for Bass Clarinet, a series of variations on the main theme
 Eliot Fisk – transcribed all 24 Caprices for solo guitar
 First Piano Quartet – Variations on a Theme of Paganini, for four pianos, eight hands
 Ignaz Friedman – Studies on a Theme of Paganini, Op. 47b (1914), for solo piano
 David Garrett – Paganini Rhapsody (2007)
 Benny Goodman – Caprice XXIV
 The Great Kat – adapted the 24th Caprice for electric guitar
 Mark Hambourg – Variations on a Theme of Paganini (1902), for solo piano
 Marc-André Hamelin – Variations on a Theme by Paganini, for solo piano (2011)
 Helloween – Used in the opening guitar solo of Future World on the High Live album
 Toshi Ichiyanagi – Paganini Personal, for marimba and piano
 Lowell Liebermann – Rhapsody on a Theme of Paganini, for piano and orchestra (2001)
 JJ Lin – Variation 25: Clash of The Souls, a song from album Lost N Found (2011)
 Franz Liszt – the sixth and last of his Études d'exécution transcendante d'après Paganini for solo piano, S.140 (1838) – revised and republished in 1851 as Six Grandes Études de Paganini, S.141
 Andrew Lloyd Webber – Variations (1977), Variations (album) originally for cello and rock band, and used as the theme for The South Bank Show, later also arranged for cello and orchestra; Song & Dance – the Dance part is a reworked version of Variations
 David Ludwig – Violin Concerto No. 2: Paganiniana, (2018) for violin and Pierrot Ensemble
 Witold Lutosławski – Variations on a Theme by Paganini, for two pianos (1940–41) or for piano and orchestra (1978)
 Yngwie Malmsteen – Used the main theme for an interlude on electric guitar on the song Prophet of Doom, from his album War to End All Wars
 Nikolai Managazze - Paganiniana (2014)
 Denis Matsuev – Caprice No. 24 variations, Denis Matsuev Quartet, jazz (2010)
 Nathan Milstein – Paganiniana, an arrangement for solo violin of the 24th Caprice, with variations based on the other caprices
 Robert Muczynski – Desperate Measures Paganini Variations, Op.48
 Pavel Necheporenko – Variations on a Theme by Paganini transcribed for unaccompanied balalaika
 Jeff Nelsen – Performed Caprice No. 24 on French Horn with Canadian Brass
 Paolo Pessina – Paganini Variations, for Violin (and Piano 'ad libitum') "to Ruggiero Ricci", Op. 25 (1997)
 Gregor Piatigorsky – Variations on a Paganini Theme, for cello and orchestra (1946), later arranged for cello and piano
 Simon Proctor – Paganini Metamorphasis, for solo piano
 Frank Proto –  Capriccio di Niccolo for Trumpet and Orchestra (1994). Nine Variants on Paganini for Double Bass and Orchestra, also for Double Bass and Piano (2001). Paganini in Metropolis for Clarinet and Wind Symphony (2001), also for Clarinet and Orchestra (2002)
 Manuel Quiroga – 9 Variations on Paganini's Caprice No. 24, 12 Variations on Paganini's Caprice No. 24, both for violin and piano
 Sergei Rachmaninoff – Rhapsody on a Theme of Paganini, Op. 43 (1934), a set of 24 variations for piano and orchestra
 George Rochberg – 50 Caprice Variations for solo violin (1970)
 Alexander Rosenblatt – Variations on Theme of Paganini, for solo piano (1988)
 Poul Ruders – Paganini Variations: Guitar Concerto No. 2 (1999–2000), 22 variations for guitar and orchestra
 Ehsan Saboohi – Metamorphosis on Theme of Paganini, for solo piano (2009)
 Fazıl Say – Paganini Jazz in Say Plays Say, for solo piano (1988)
 Stanisław Skrowaczewski – Concerto Nicolò, for piano left hand and orchestra (2003)
 Joe Stump – used the main theme for an interpretation on the song Paganini's Revenge on the album Guitar Dominance. The track also incorporates elements from Paganini's 5th Caprice
 Karol Szymanowski – No. 3 from Trzy kaprysy Paganiniego (3 Caprices de Paganini), Op. 40 (1918); transcriptions for violin and piano
 George Thalben-Ball – Variations on a Theme of Paganini, theme and 10 variations for Pipe organ. All except the last variation are for solo organ pedals
 Philip Wilby – Paganini Variations, for both wind band and brass band
 Victor Wooten – Classical Thump, A Show Of Hands
 Eugène Ysaÿe – Variations on Paganini's Caprice No. 24, for violin and piano, Op. posthumous

See also
 :File:Caprice-24-a4.pdf Violin sheet music for this piece

References

External links
PDF score of the 24th Caprice at the Werner Icking Music Archive (arranged for guitar)

Paganini Caprice 24
Caprice 24
Compositions in A minor
Articles containing video clips
1817 compositions